

Publications

January
 January 3: Suat Yalaz's Karaoğlan makes its debut.
 January 15: René Goscinny and Jean Tabary's Iznogoud makes its debut. Originally the caliph Haroun El Poussah is the title character, but Iznogoud soon becomes so popular that the series is renamed after him.
 January 20: The first issue of the British magazine Look and Learn is published. It will run until 1982. 
Amazing Adult Fantasy (1961 series) #8 – Marvel Comics
Fantastic Four (1961 series) #2 - Marvel Comics
First appearance of the Skrulls
Journey into Mystery (1952 series) #76 - Marvel Comics
Kid Colt: Outlaw (1948 series) #102 - Marvel Comics
Strange Tales (1951 series) #92 - Marvel Comics
Tales of Suspense (1959 series) #25 - Marvel Comics
Tales to Astonish (1959 series) #27 - Marvel Comics
First appearance of Henry "Hank" Pym

February
 February 6: In Le journal de Tintin, first episode of Les casse-cou, by Jean Graton.
 February 8: Jean Roba's La Ribambelle debuts in Spirou.
 Aquaman #1 — DC Comics
Amazing Adult Fantasy (1961 series) #9 - Marvel Comics
 Help! vol. 2, #1 — Warren Publishing
Journey into Mystery (1952 series) #77 - Marvel Comics
Rawhide Kid (1955 series) #26 - Marvel Comics
Strange Tales (1951 series) #93 - Marvel Comics
Tales of Suspense (1959 series) #26 - Marvel Comics
Tales to Astonish (1959 series) #28 - Marvel Comics

March
 March 1: The first episode of René Goscinny and Jean Tabary's Valentin Le Vagabond is published in Pilote. The series will run until 1973.
March 22: In Pilote, the first chapter of Asterix the gladiator, by Goscinny and Uderzo is prepublished. The story marks the debut of the pirates, whose unlucky encounters with the gauls will become a running gag in each album.
Amazing Adult Fantasy (1961 series) #10 - Marvel Comics
Cave of Ali Baba, by Carl Barks, on Uncle Scrooge #37 - Dell Comics.
Fantastic Four (1961 series) #3 - Marvel Comics
Journey into Mystery (1952 series) #78 - Marvel Comics
Kid Colt: Outlaw (1948 series) #103 - Marvel Comics
Strange Tales (1951 series) #94 - Marvel Comics
Tales of Suspense (1959 series) #27 - Marvel Comics
Tales to Astonish (1959 series) #29 - Marvel Comics
The Italian editor Luciano Secchi debuts as an author with the western series Maschera nera (Black mask), designed by Paolo Piffarerio and published by Editoriale Corno. For the occasion, the writer takes the pen name Max Bunker.

April
April 2: in V-Magazine, Barbarella by Jean-Claude Forest makes her debut.
April 13: Hugo Pratt's Fort Wheeling debuts in the Argentine review Misterix
The final issue of the American comics magazine The Funnies is published.
Amazing Adult Fantasy (1961 series) #11 - Marvel Comics
Journey into Mystery (1952 series) #79 - Marvel Comics
Rawhide Kid (1955 series) #27 - Marvel Comics
Strange Tales (1951 series) #95 - Marvel Comics
Tales of Suspense (1959 series) #28 - Marvel Comics
Tales to Astonish (1959 series) #30 - Marvel Comics

May
May 10: In Spirou, the first chapter of The Daltons in the blizzard, by Goscinny and Morris is prepublished.
Amazing Adult Fantasy (1961 series) #12 - Marvel Comics
Fantastic Four (1961 series) #4 - Marvel Comics
Reintroduction of Namor the Sub-Mariner into Marvel Comics continuity.
The Incredible Hulk (1962 series) #1 - Marvel Comics
First appearance of the Hulk, Thunderbolt Ross, Betty Ross, and Rick Jones
Journey into Mystery (1952 series) #80 - Marvel Comics
Kid Colt: Outlaw (1948 series) #104 - Marvel Comics
 The Lone Ranger (1948 series), with issue #145, cancelled by Dell Comics
 Strange Adventures #140, "The Strange Adventure That Really Happened," featuring DC Comics staff members Julius Schwartz and Sid Greene struggling to make writer Gardner Fox recall a story he has written that holds the key to saving the Earth from alien invasion.
Strange Tales (1951 series) #96 - Marvel Comics
Tales of Suspense (1959 series) #29 - Marvel Comics
Tales to Astonish (1959 series) #31 - Marvel Comics

June
 June 21: Carmen Barbará's Mary Noticias is first published.
Amazing Adult Fantasy (1961 series) #13 - Marvel Comics
Rawhide Kid (1955 series) #28 - Marvel Comics
Strange Tales (1951 series) #97 - Marvel Comics
Tales of Suspense (1959 series) #30 - Marvel Comics
Tales to Astonish (1959 series) #32 - Marvel Comics
 Uncle Scrooge (1953 series) #38 - Dell comics; "The Unsafe Safe" by Carl Barks

July
 July 20: Héctor Germán Oesterheld and Alberto Breccia's prologue story Ezra Winston el anticuario is first published and features the debut of Ezra Winston.
 The final episode of Don Freeman and Jack Monk's Buck Ryan is published.
Amazing Adult Fantasy (1961 series) #14 - Marvel Comics
Fantastic Four (1961 series) #5 - Marvel Comics
First appearance of Doctor Doom
The Incredible Hulk (1962 series) #2 - Marvel Comics
Kid Colt: Outlaw (1948 series) #105 - Marvel Comics
Strange Tales (1951 series) #98 - Marvel Comics
Tales of Suspense (1959 series) #31 - Marvel Comics
Tales to Astonish (1959 series) #33 - Marvel Comics
 With issue #131 (July/August cover date), Dell Comics cancels Tarzan.

August
 August 17: Héctor Germán Oesterheld and Alberto Breccia's Mort Cinder makes its debut.
August 26: In the Disney magazine Topolino the first episode of Paperon de Paperoni visir di Papatoa by Rodolfo Cimino and Romano Scarpa is published.
 The final issue of Classics Illustrated Junior is published. 
Amazing Fantasy (1961 series) #15 renamed from Amazing Adult Fantasy - Marvel Comics
First appearance of Stan Lee and Steve Ditko's Spider-Man.
Journey into Mystery (1952 series) #83 - Marvel Comics
First appearance of Thor
Rawhide Kid (1955 series) #29 - Marvel Comics
Strange Tales (1951 series) #99 - Marvel Comics
Tales of Suspense (1959 series) #32 - Marvel Comics
Tales to Astonish (1959 series) #34 - Marvel Comics

September
 September 5: 
 The first issue of the Flemish comics magazine Pats is published. It's a weekly children's supplement of the newspapers Het Nieuwsblad, De Standaard, Het Handelsblad, De Gentenaar and De Landwacht. It will run until 27 February 1974, after which it changes its name to the Patskrant. 
 Inside the first issue of Pats Willy Vandersteen's comics series Pats (1962-1977) makes its debut., as well as Gommaar Timmermans' long-running children's comic Fideel de Fluwelen Ridder.
 September 15: The final issue of the British comics magazine Film Fun is published, which merges with Buster.
First issue of Gatto Felix (Edizioni Bianconi), a licensed version of Felix the cat, by Italian authors.
Fantastic Four (1961 series) #6 - Marvel Comics
The Incredible Hulk (1962 series) #3 - Marvel Comics
First appearance of the Ringmaster and the second Circus of Crime
Journey into Mystery (1952 series) #84 - Marvel Comics
First appearance of Jane Foster
Kid Colt: Outlaw (1948 series) #106 - Marvel Comics
Strange Tales (1951 series) #100 - Marvel Comics
Strange Tales Annual (1962 series) #1 - Marvel Comics
Tales of Suspense (1959 series) #33 - Marvel Comics
Tales to Astonish (1959 series) #35 - Marvel Comics
First appearance of Ant-Man

October
 October 6: The first issue of the British comics magazine Valiant is published. It will run until 16 October 1976.
Fantastic Four (1961 series) #7 - Marvel Comics
Journey into Mystery (1952 series) #85 - Marvel Comics
First appearance of Loki, Balder, Sif, Odin & Asgard
Little Annie Fanny by Harvey Kurtzman and Will Elder makes its debut in Playboy. 
Rawhide Kid (1955 series) #30 - Marvel Comics
Strange Tales (1951 series) #101 - Marvel Comics
First solo Human Torch (Johnny Storm) feature
Tales of Suspense (1959 series) #34 - Marvel Comics
Tales to Astonish (1959 series) #36 - Marvel Comics
In Italy, the first issue of Collana eroica, (Italian translation of the Fleetway war comics) is published by Editoriale Dardo.

November
 November 1: In Il re del terrore (King of terror), the first episode of Angela and Luciana Giussani's Diabolik is published.
November 1: In Spirou, the first chapter of the Lucky Luke story The Wagon Train by Goscinny and Morris is prepublished.
 November 22: The Suske en Wiske story Het Rijmende Paard by Willy Vandersteen is first published in the newspapers. Halfway the story the series' nemesis Krimson makes his debut.
Fantastic Four (1961 series) #8 - Marvel Comics
First appearance of Puppet Master
The Incredible Hulk (1962 series) #4 - Marvel Comics
Journey into Mystery (1952 series) #86 - Marvel Comics
First appearance of Zarrko the Tomorrow Man
Kid Colt: Outlaw (1948 series) #107 - Marvel Comics
Strange Tales (1951 series) #102 - Marvel Comics
First appearance of the Wizard
Tales of Suspense (1959 series) #35 - Marvel Comics
Tales to Astonish (1959 series) #37 - Marvel Comics
Two-Gun Kid (1948 series) #60 - Marvel Comics
 With issue #132, Gold Key Comics begins publishing Tarzan, which it acquired from Dell Comics.

December
 December 10: Willy Vandersteen's western comics series Karl May, based on the novels by Karl May, is launched and will run until 1977.
 December 20: The first episode of Hubuc and Jacques Devos' Victor Sébastopol is published in Spirou.
 December 29: The final episode of Al Capp and Bob Lubbers 's Long Sam is published.
Fantastic Four (1961 series) #9 - Marvel Comics
Journey into Mystery (1952 series) #87 - Marvel Comics
Rawhide Kid (1955 series) #31 - Marvel Comics
Strange Tales (1951 series) #103 - Marvel Comics
Tales of Suspense (1959 series) #36 - Marvel Comics
Tales to Astonish (1959 series) #38 - Marvel Comics
First appearance of Egghead (Marvel Comics)

Specific date unknown
 Gene Deitch's Maly Svet (Small World) runs in Kvety, the official weekly of the Czech Communist Party for 12 episodes, after which it is discontinued because of its veiled satire of Communism.
 David Sutherland is assigned to continue the popular gag comic The Bash Street Kids in The Beano. He will draw the series from 1962 until his death in early 2023.

Births

October
 October 31: Don Asmussen, American comics artist (The San Francisco Strip, Bad Reporter, Super Average Joe), (d. 2021) from brain cancer.

Deaths

January
 January 13: Ernie Kovacs, American comedian and comics writer (Mad ), dies at age 42 in a car accident.
 January 22: Jack Patton, American comics artist (Restless Age, Dolly Burns, Spencer Easley), dies at age 61.

February
 February 12: Ding Darling, American cartoonist and comics artist (Taking the Day's Work Home to Be Free From Interruptions, We Could Live Just as Cheaply as Our Fathers, The Great American Sucker, The Musical Career of Tillie Clapsaddle), dies at age 85.
 February 14: James Crighton, Scottish comics artist (Korky the Cat), passes away at age 70.

March
 March 2: J.F. Horrabin, British comics artist (Japhet and Happy, Dot and Carrie), cartoonist and writer, dies at age 77.
 March 5: Cornelis Veth, Dutch painter, cartoonist, journalist, writer and illustrator, dies at age 82.

April
 April 18: Don Wootton, American comics artist (Seeing Stars), commits suicide at age 66.
 April 21: 
 Bob McCay, American comics artist (continued his father's Little Nemo in Slumberland), dies at age 65.
 Bob Wickersham, American animator and comics artist (American Comics Group (ACG), Timely Comics, Real Screen Comics and Ned Pines Comics), dies at age 50.
 April 25: Billy Cam, American comics artist (Camouflages), dies at age 70.
 April 26: Carlos Neve, Mexican comic artist (Segundo I, Rey de Moscabia, Rocambole), dies at age 71–72.

May
 May 12: Dick Calkins, American comics artist (Buck Rogers), dies at age 67.
 May 22: John H. Striebel, American comics artist (Dixie Dugan), dies at age 79.
 May 24: Vic Forsythe, American comics artist (Joe Jinks), dies at age 76.

June
 June 21: Tom Webster, British cartoonist (drew sports cartoons), dies at age 76.

August
 August 5: John Willie, British photographer and comics artist (Sweet Gwendoline), dies at age 59.
 August 7: Mikhail Cheremnykh, Russian caricaturist, painter, illustrator, poster artist and comics artist (Soviet propaganda comics), dies at age 71.

September
 September 17: Harry L. Parkhurst, American illustrator and comics artist (Murder for Exercise, Dear Little Dude), dies at age 86.
 September 26: George Carlson (Jingle Jangle Comics), American comics artist, dies at age 84 or 85.
 September 28: Bernardo Marques, Portuguese painter and comics artist, dies at age 64.

October
 Specific date unknown: Forest A. McGinn, American comics artist (made a celebrity comic about Joe Martin, a Hollywood orang-utan), dies at age 69.

November
 November 2: Kurt Ludwig Schmidt, aka Becker-Kasch, German comics artist (Tim und Tobby, Mischa im Weltraum, Die Löwe Adolar, Rolf Kauka comics), dies at age 53.
 November 4: Guillermo Cifré, Spanish comics artist (Don Furcio, Cucufato Pi, Reporter Tribulete), dies at age 39.
 November 9: Emile Brumsteede, Dutch film director and comics artist (Dannie ben ik), dies at age 51.
 November 17: Albéric Bourgeois, Canadian comics artist (Les Aventures de Timothée, Les Aventures de Toinon, Les Fables du Parc Lafontaine, continued Le Père Ladébauche), passes away at age 86.

December
 December 12: David Bueno de Mesquita, Dutch graphic artist, illustrator and comics artist (De Geschiedenis van Gulzigen Tobias, Billie Ritchie en Zijn Ezel), passes away at age 73.

Specific date unknown
 Arch Dale, Scottish-Canadian cartoonist and comics artist (The Doo-Dads), dies at age 79 or 80.
 Guido Moroni-Celsi, Italian comics artist (Bonifazio, I Misteri della Giungla Nera, La Conquista di Mompracem), dies at age 77.
 Hal Rasmusson, American illustrator and comics artist (Aggie Mack), dies at age 61 or 62.
 Robert Q. Sale, American comics artist (worked for Lev Gleason, Funnies Inc., D.S. Publishing & Hillman, DC Comics, Novelty Comics, Marvel Comics/Atlas Comics), dies at age 37 or 38.
 H.M. Talintyre, British comics artist (Uncle Oojah, Jack and Jill), dies at age 68 or 69.

First issues by title 
Help! (vol. 2) — Warren Publishing
 Release: February. Editor: Harvey Kurtzman

The Incredible Hulk (Marvel Comics)
 Release: May. Writer: Stan Lee. Artist: Jack Kirby

Pep (The Netherlands)
 Release: October 6. Note: Runs until 26 September 1975, after which it merges with Sjors to become Eppo

Initial appearances by character name

Marvel Comics 
 Ant-Man in Tales to Astonish #35 (Sept.)
 Aunt May in Amazing Fantasy #15 (Aug.)
 Balder in Journey into Mystery #85 (Oct.)
 Betty Ross in The Incredible Hulk #1 (May)
 Doctor Doom in Fantastic Four #5 (July)
 Egghead (Marvel Comics) in Tales to Astonish #38 (Dec.)
 Henry "Hank" Pym in Tales to Astonish #27 (Jan.)
 Hulk in The Incredible Hulk #1 (May)
 Loki in Journey into Mystery #85 (Oct.)
 Odin in Journey into Mystery #85 (Oct.)
 Puppet Master in Fantastic Four #8 (Nov.)
 Rick Jones in The Incredible Hulk #1 (May)
 Sif in Journey into Mystery #85 (Oct.)
 Spider-Man in Amazing Fantasy #15 (Aug.)
 the Skrulls in Fantastic Four #2 (Jan.)
 Thor in Journey into Mystery #83 (Aug.)
 Thunderbolt Ross in The Incredible Hulk #1 (May)
 Uncle Ben in Amazing Fantasy #15 (Aug.)
 the Wizard in Strange Tales #102 (Nov.)
 Zarrko the Tomorrow Man in Journey into Mystery #86 (Nov.)

DC Comics

Doctor Light (Arthur Light), in Justice League of America #12 (June)
The Floronic Man, in Atom #01 (July)
Felix Faust, in Justice League of America #10 (March)
Abra Kadabra (comics), in The Flash #128 (May)
Will Magnus, in Showcase #37 (March)
Chronos (comics), in Atom #07 (November)
Chemo (comics), in Showcase #39 (July)
Ultra Boy, in Superboy #98 (July)
Matter-Eater Lad, in Adventure Comics #303 (December)
Metal Men, in Showcase #37 (March)
Storm Boy, in Adventure Comics #301 (October)
Chameleon Chief, in Superman's Pal, Jimmy Olsen #63 (September)

Other publishers 
Wonder Wart-Hog, in Bachannal (Spring)
Whitewater Duck, in Log Jockey by Carl Barks (Disney)
Diabolik, by the Giussani sisters, in King of terror (Astorina, November)
Inspector Ginko, Diabolik's antagonist, in King of terror (Astorina, November)

References